The Baharna are one of ethnically diverse Bahrain's many ethnic groups. The following is a list of notable Bahrani figures

Academics 
 Ali Al-Ahmed, Bahraini political activist, public speaker, scholar, writer
 Zainab Bahrani, Iraqi art historian
 Abdulhadi Khalaf, Bahraini leftist political activist and academic

Actors
 Ali Al-Sebaa, Saudi television actor

Bloggers
 Ali Abdulemam, Bahraini blogger and contributor to Global Voices
 Mahmood Al-Yousif, Bahrani blogger and political activist

Businesspeople
 Amin H. Nasser, CEO of Saudi Arabian oil company Saudi Aramco
 Nadhmi Al-Nasr, CEO of NEOM
Mahdi Al Tajir, businessman from the United Arab Emirates, based in the United Kingdom
Yusuf Bin Ahmed Kanoo, Bahraini merchant and trader
Yara Salman, Bahraini businesswomen who introduced cryotherapy to the country

Film directors
 Ramin Bahrani, Iranian American director and screenwriter
 Shahriar Bahrani, Iranian film director

Journalists 
 Mansoor Al-Jamri, son of Bahrain's spiritual leader, Sheikh Abdul-Amir Al-Jamri
 Leila Al Mutawa (born 1987), novelist and journalist

Musicians
 Mohammed Haddad, composer and music critic
 Majeed Marhoon, saxophonist and a former Leftist political activist with the National Liberation Front of Bahrain
 Majid Al-Maskati, singer of the Canadian R&B duo Majid Jordan

Philosophers
 Kamal al-Deen Maitham al-Bahrani, famous 13th century philosopher

Poets and writers
 Ebrahim Al-Arrayedh, one of the greatest poets of Bahrain and the Persian Gulf
 Thuraya Al Arrayedh, daughter of Ebrahim Al-Arrayedh
 Ali Al Jallawi, poet, researcher, and writer
 Ayat Al-Qurmezi, poet
 Mohammed Hasan Kamaluddin, Bahraini former minister, poet, ex-diplomat, historian, writer, and researcher

Politicians
 Abdulwahid AlAbduljabbar, Saudi political activist
 Majeed Al Alawi, Bahrain's Minister of Labour Affairs
 Jawad Al-Arrayedh, Bahrain's first Shia Deputy Prime Minister
 Nazar Al Baharna, Minister of State for Foreign Affairs of Bahrain
 Abdul Amir al-Jamri, spiritual leader of the Bahrani people
 Abdulhadi Al Khawaja, Bahraini human rights activist and hunger striker
 Massouma al-Mubarak, Kuwait's first female minister
 Nimr al-Nimr, spiritual leader of the 2011 Saudi Arabian protests
 Hussain Al-Qallaf Al-Bahrani, member of the Kuwaiti National Assembly
 Nada Haffadh, Bahrain's first ever female cabinet minister when she was appointed Minister of Health
 Hasan Mushaima, Bahraini political activist
 Isa Qassim, spiritual leader of Al Wefaq, Bahrain's biggest opposition society. He was the leader and founder of the Islamic Awareness Institution
 Nabeel Rajab, Bahraini human rights activist
 Ali Salman, leader of the largest political party in Bahrain
 Hussain Al Baharna, lawyer

Rebels
 Abu al-Bahlul al-Awwam, member of the Abdul Qays tribe who deposed the Qarmatians in Bahrain
 Sayyid Shubar al-Sitri, attempted a coup d'état in 1895, however it failed due to lack of support from Shi'a clerics

Religious figures

Grand Ayatollahs
 Shaykh Ahmad, founder of the Shaykhí school of thought
 Maitham Al Bahrani, renowned 13th-century Shi'a cleric and theologian
 Yusuf Al Bahrani, renowned 18th-century Shi'a cleric
 Alaaeldeen Alghurayfi, Iraqi Shi'a Marja
 Salih Al-Karzakani, renowned 17th-century Shi'a cleric
 Abbas Almohri, renowned 20th-century Shi'a cleric
 Abdullah al Samahiji, renowned 18th-century Shi'a cleric

Sports
 Ismael Abdullatif, Bahraini football player
 Sayed Mohamed Adnan, Bahraini football player
 Hamad Al Fardan, Bahraini racing driver
 Tareq Al-Farsani, Bahraini bodybuilder
 Husain Ali, Bahraini football player
 Hussein Taher Al-Sabee, Saudi long jumper
 Hussein Al-Sadiq, Bahraini football player
 Jamal Al-Saffar, Saudi sprinter
 Abbas Ayyad, Bahraini football player
 A'ala Hubail, Bahraini football player
 Mohamed Hubail, Bahraini football player
 Sayed Mohammed Jaffer, Bahraini football player
 Abbas Ahmed Khamis, Bahraini football player
 Hussain Salman, Bahraini football player

References

Further reading
Rival Empires of Trade and Imami Shiism in Eastern Arabia, 1300-1800, Juan Cole, International Journal of Middle East Studies, Vol. 19, No. 2, (May, 1987), pp. 177–203

External links
 The 1922 Bahrani uprising in Bahrain
 

Arab groups
Society of Saudi Arabia
Society of Bahrain
Society of Iraq
Society of Kuwait
Bahrani people
Bahranis